Jimmy Connors was the defending champion and successfully defended his title, defeating Eliot Teltscher in the final, 6–3, 6–2.

Seeds

Draw

Finals

Top half

Bottom half

References
Main Draw

1980 Grand Prix (tennis)